The 1985 World Table Tennis Championships were held in Göteborg from March 28 to April 7, 1985.

Results

Team

Individual

References

External links
ITTF Museum

 
World Table Tennis Championships
World Table Tennis Championships
World Table Tennis Championships
Table tennis competitions in Sweden
Table
International sports competitions in Gothenburg
1980s in Gothenburg
World Table Tennis Championships
World Table Tennis Championships